The executive branch of the Government of New South Wales, Australia, is made up of a number of departments, state-owned corporations and other agencies. These are identified in the Government Sector Employment Act 2013 and other legislation. In 2009, most State government agencies – which at the time numbered more than 100 – were restructured into 13 'super agencies' or clusters. This number was subsequently reduced to ten clusters in 2013; and in July 2019 following the 2019 state election, it was further reduced to eight clusters. A new cluster for Regional NSW was created in April 2020, increasing to nine clusters; and a further cluster, Enterprise, Investment and Trade, established on 21 December 2021, in the second Perrottet ministry.

Agency types 

The Government is made up of:

 departments, which are the lead agencies in each cluster
 executive agencies, which are agencies related to departments
 separate agencies, which operate independently of departments but can still be within clusters
 statutory authorities, which are established under legislation but sit outside clusters
 state-owned corporations
 subsidiaries of the NSW Government established under the Corporations Act
 councils under the Local Government Act
 universities.

There are also a number of advisory boards and committees, though these are not agencies in their own right.

Clusters 
The NSW Public Sector employs more than 348,000 people (full-time equivalent), almost all of whom work within one of the ten clusters. A restructure into eight clusters took effect on 1 July 2019; and a new cluster was added in April 2020; with a further cluster added on 21 December 2021.

List of agencies

Departments

Executive agencies
This is a list of executive agencies of the NSW Government, as listed in Schedule 4 of the Administrative Arrangements (Second Perrottet Ministry—Transitional) Order 2021, containing Amendment No. 40 to the Government Sector Employment Act 2013:

Separate agencies
This is a list of separate agencies of the NSW Government, as listed in Schedule 1 of the Government Sector Employment Act 2013:

Statutory State-owned corporations
This is a list of statutory State-owned corporations of the NSW Government, as listed in Schedule 5 of the State Owned Corporations Act 1989:

Other agencies

Universities

Independent statutory bodies

The Law and Justice Foundation of NSW is an independent statutory body, established by the Law and Justice Foundation Act 2000. It is a justice research organisation, with an explicit mandate to focus on the legal needs of the community, its aim being "to contribute to the development of a fair and equitable justice system that addresses the legal needs of the community and improves access to justice by the community, particularly by socially and economically disadvantaged people". It creates, analyses, and provides data, supports planning of legal assistance in the state, and manages a grants program. It gave the Aboriginal Justice Award from 2002 until 2017, after which funding for the award was withdrawn.

References 

New South Wales
 
Government Agencies